Gae Gae is a Burmese singer. Her debut  album "Nin Thar Shi Yin", was released in 2015. She has released her second albrum 
 Yainhkone lhoet mha hoteyaelarr in 2017.

Discography

Solo albums
 Nin Thar Shi Yin (နင်သာရှိရင်) (2015)
 Yinhkone lhoet mha hoteyaelarr (ရင်ခုန်လို့မှဟုတ်ရဲ့လား) (2017)
 Friend (2019)

Duo albums
Nar Mal Kyee (နာမည်ကြီး) 2019

Personal life
She has been in a relationship with model Swe Zin Htet  who was crowned Miss Universe Myanmar 2019.

References

21st-century Burmese women singers
Living people
21st-century Burmese actresses
People from Yangon
Burmese LGBT people
1991 births